Langsdorfia malina is a moth in the family Cossidae. It is found in Ecuador (Loja Province).

References

Natural History Museum Lepidoptera generic names catalog

Hypoptinae